Jane Rubel (born Jane Christoffer on December 31, 1955) is an athlete and postal worker noted for her lawsuit against the Iowa Girls High School Athletic Union (IGHSAU) when she was denied eligibility to play after marrying and having a child.

Rubel attended Ruthven Consolidated High School beginning in 1968, where she played on the basketball team in her freshman and sophomore years, averaging 35 and 47 points per game respectively. Coach Richard Barber stated that she was "as good a player as we've had in the 20 years I've been here". In 1970, she married and had a daughter. In 1971, she approached the school about rejoining the basketball team to pursue a possible college scholarship. However, a rule of the IGHSAU forbade married women and mothers from participating, meaning that if she were allowed to do so, it "would effectively disqualify all of Ruthven's girls' teams from being able to compete in any sports".

When Rubel was denied eligibility again in the 1971–72 season, she filed suit against the IGHSAU for violation of her civil rights. The suit noted that the rules discriminated against female students, as male students were permitted to be married and/or fathers and still participate in sports. Shortly before the hearing scheduled to argue the case, IGHSAU reversed course and ruled that Rubel was eligible. In January 1972, the court ruled "IGHSAU had violated the constitutions of both the United States and the state of Iowa by barring married and divorced women and mothers from participating in high school sports."

Rubel ultimately completed her senior year at Ruthven on the basketball team, although she contends that IGHSAU unjustly prevented her from qualifying for the state tournament in that year. After graduating, she became a postal worker and had a second daughter.

Her papers are held by the Iowa Women's Archives.

References

 "Iowa High School Mothers Wins Right to Sports Role", The New York Times (21 November 1971)
 Shelley Lucas (Fall 2003), "Courting Controversy: Gender and Power in Iowa Girls' Basketball", Journal of Sport History pp. 281–308

External links
 Oral history, Digital Commonwealth

Living people
American women's basketball players
Basketball players from Iowa
1955 births
21st-century American women
Child marriage in the United States
History of women in Iowa